Talking Dead is a live television aftershow in which host Chris Hardwick discusses episodes of the AMC television series The Walking Dead, Fear the Walking Dead and The Walking Dead: World Beyond with guests, including celebrity fans, cast members, and crew from the series.

Series overview

AMC officially counts the first season of Talking Dead as season 2 and each subsequent season one number higher than is listed here. This is so that the season numbers for episodes of Talking Dead match the season numbers for episodes of The Walking Dead that they discuss.

Episodes

Season 1 (2011–12)
These episodes discuss season two of The Walking Dead.

Season 2 (2012–13)
These episodes discuss season three of The Walking Dead. This season featured a special "season 3 preview" episode which aired in July 2012.

Season 3 (2013–14)
These episodes discuss season four of The Walking Dead.

Season 4 (2014–15)
These episodes discuss season five of The Walking Dead. This season introduced live polls as well as a live interactive quiz where fans compete online on their mobile phones, tablets, or computer.

Season 5 (2015–16)
These episodes discuss season six of The Walking Dead and season two of Fear the Walking Dead. This season also hosted an Ultimate Fan Contest where fans can submit clips on why they are the ultimate fan. Greg Raiewski was chosen as the winner to be a guest in the fourteenth episode. Episodes 24 and 25 were pre-recorded due to Hardwick's wedding and honeymoon.

Season 6 (2016–17)
These episodes discuss season seven of The Walking Dead and season three of Fear the Walking Dead. During the season five finale, Hardwick announced that the 90-minute season premiere would take place at Hollywood Forever Cemetery. Chandler Riggs was originally scheduled to appear in the season premiere but was rescheduled to the seventh episode. In addition, some last-minute replacements occurred after the original guest was unable to attend the taping, with Jonah Ray replacing Sarah Hyland in the sixth episode and Cooper Andrews replacing Chris D'Elia in the tenth episode. Another Ultimate Fan Contest was held during the mid-season finale where the selected finalists made their case to Robert Kirkman and Norman Reedus, and explain why they are the ultimate Walking Dead fan. Jill Robi and Brendan Orban-Griggs were chosen as the winners of the contest.

Season 7 (2017–18)
These episodes discuss season eight of The Walking Dead and season four of Fear the Walking Dead. The special two-hour premiere was held live at the Greek Theatre in Los Angeles and featured all twenty of the main cast for the season as well as executive producers and former cast members. The sixteenth episode discussed the crossover event that featured the season 8 finale and season 4 premiere of The Walking Dead and Fear the Walking Dead, respectively. Ashley Weidman was the winner of the third Walking Dead Ultimate Fan contest.

Season 8 (2018–19)
These episodes discuss season nine of The Walking Dead and select episodes of season five of Fear the Walking Dead.

Season 9 (2019–21)
These episodes discuss season ten of The Walking Dead, and selected episodes of season six of Fear the Walking Dead and season one of The Walking Dead: World Beyond. The March 15 episode was canceled due to the COVID-19 pandemic. Beginning with the March 22 episode, Hardwick and the guests speak from their homes via webcam. The sixteenth episode discussed the crossover event that featured the season 10 finale and season 1 premiere of The Walking Dead and The Walking Dead: World Beyond, respectively.

Season 10 (2021–22)
These episodes discuss season eleven of The Walking Dead, season seven of Fear the Walking Dead and season two of The Walking Dead: World Beyond.

Specials

References

External links
 
 

The Walking Dead (franchise)
Talking Dead